The 1972 New Mexico Lobos football team was an American football team that represented the University of New Mexico in the Western Athletic Conference (WAC) during the 1972 NCAA University Division football season.  In their fifth season under head coach Rudy Feldman, the Lobos compiled a 3–8 record (2–4 against WAC opponents) and were outscored by a total of 327 to 208.

John Urban and George Oakes were the team captains. The team's statistical leaders included Bruce Boone with 540 passing yards, Fred Henry with 977 rushing yards and 36 points, and Ken Smith with 382 receiving yards.

Schedule

References

New Mexico
New Mexico Lobos football seasons
New Mexico Lobos football